Badreddine Bushara (born 4 January 2004) is a Finnish professional footballer currently playing as a forward for Ilves.

Club career
Bushara signed a new contract with Ilves in July 2022.

International career
Born in Finland, Bushara is of Sudanese descent. He has represented Finland from under-15 to under-19 level.

Career statistics

Club

References

2004 births
Living people
Finnish footballers
Finland youth international footballers
Finnish people of Sudanese descent
Association football forwards
Kakkonen players
Veikkausliiga players
FC Ilves players